Ridin' Rainbows is the seventh studio album by American country music singer Tanya Tucker. It was released on February 14, 1977, by MCA Records. The album was produced by Jerry Crutchfield and includes three top 20 hits; "Ridin' Rainbows", "It's a Cowboy Lovin' Night" and "Dancing the Night Away".

Critical reception

The review in the February 26, 1977 issue of Billboard said, "Each LP effort brings Tanya closer to the crossover she's been striving for. Some excellent soulful singing highlighted with tasteful string arrangements by Bergen White and Jack Williams and sharp instrumentation bring out the pop potential in the young MCA artist. Members of the Amazing Rhythm Aces add backup vocals to "Dancing the Night Away" written by Russell Smith and James H. Brown Jr. and included on the Aces last album (Too Stuffed to Jump). Seals & Crofts also lend vocals on "Knee Deep in Loving You". A definite step in the right direction by Tucker and producer, Jerry Crutchfield." The review noted "Love Me Like You Never Will Again", "Wait 'Til Daddy Finds Out", "Let's Keep It That Way", Ridin' Rainbows", and "Wings" as the best cuts on the album.

Commercial performance
The album peaked at No. 16 on the US Billboard Hot Country LPs chart.

The album's first single, "Ridin' Rainbows", was originally released in November 1976 as the B-side of "Short Cut" from Tucker's previous album, Here's Some Love. When "Short Cut" failed to chart and radio began to play the B-side instead, the label officially issued "Ridin' Rainbows" as a single in December 1976. It peaked at No. 12 on the US Billboard Hot Country Singles chart and No. 7 in Canada on the RPM Country Singles chart. The second single, "It's a Cowboy Lovin' Night", was released in April 1977 and peaked at No. 7 on the US Billboard Hot Country Singles chart and No. 2 in Canada on the RPM Country Singles chart. The third and final single, "Dancing the Night Away", was released in August 1977 and peaked at No. 16 on the US Billboard Hot Country Singles chart and No. 19 in Canada on the RPM Country Singles chart.

Track listing

Charts
Album

Singles

References

1977 albums
Tanya Tucker albums
MCA Records albums
Albums produced by Jerry Crutchfield